Nyssicostylus is a genus of beetles in the family Cerambycidae, containing the following species:

 Nyssicostylus melzeri Chemsak & Martins, 1966
 Nyssicostylus overali Galileo & Martins, 1990
 Nyssicostylus paraba Martins, 2005
 Nyssicostylus subopacus (Bates, 1885)

References

Elaphidiini